Potassium peroxide is an inorganic compound with the molecular formula K2O2.  It is formed as potassium reacts with oxygen in the air, along with potassium oxide (K2O) and potassium superoxide (KO2).

Potassium peroxide reacts with water to form potassium hydroxide and oxygen:

 2K2O2 + 2H2O -> 4KOH + O2 (^)

Properties
Potassium peroxide is a highly reactive, oxidizing white to yellowish solid which, while not flammable itself, reacts violently with flammable materials. It decomposes violently on contact with water. [1]

The standard enthalpy of formation of potassium peroxide is ΔH f 0  = −496 kJ/mol.

Usage 
Potassium Peroxide is used as an oxidizing agent and bleach (due to the peroxide), and to purify air.

References

Peroxides
Potassium compounds
Oxidizing agents